Let's play English is Japanese TV program which is on aired from April 2, 1990. It evolved to Let's play English with Orton on April 3, 2017.

Cast
Atsugiri Jason
Rie Tanaka
Naomi Claire
Mary Allen
Akira Sakamoto

Main corner
Eat the world
The characters cook the meals in the world.
Dear Karie
Karie plays with the kids and parents.
Quiz Corner
Dr.Jayson and his mates push the buttons which speak English words. It is said only once. 
Orton's exercise
Rie Tanaka dances exercise.

Link
Official site

Japanese children's television series
1990 Japanese television series debuts
2017 Japanese television series endings
NHK original programming
Japanese television shows featuring puppetry
Japanese television series with live action and animation